Reino is a comune (municipality) in the Province of Benevento in the Italian region Campania, located about 70 km northeast of Naples and about 15 km north of Benevento. As of 31 December 2004, it had a population of 1,344 and an area of 23.6 km2.

Reino borders the following municipalities: Circello, Colle Sannita, Fragneto l'Abate, Pesco Sannita, San Marco dei Cavoti.

References

Cities and towns in Campania